Lamput is an Indian animated television series of shorts created by Vaibhav Kumaresh and produced by Vaibhav Studios for Cartoon Network Asia, consisting of 15 seconds micro shorts that were extended to 2 minutes for the second season. It is the second CN Indian original series after Roll No 21, which airs on Cartoon Network India. Season 3 consists of episodes ranging from 3 to 5 minutes, as well as 7-minute specials, airing on Cartoon Network in Asia, EMEA and Latin America. Lamput has also started airing on Boomerang worldwide.

Series overview

Episodes

Season 1 (2017) 
In Season 1, all episodes are in 15 seconds.

Season 2 (2018)

Season 3 (2020-21)

Season 4 (2022)

References 

Lists of Indian television series episodes
Lists of animated television series episodes